Nazareth Area School District is a public school district located in Northampton County, Pennsylvania in the Lehigh Valley region of eastern Pennsylvania.  It serves the boroughs of Nazareth, Stockertown, and Tatamy, and the townships of Bushkill, Lower Nazareth, and Upper Nazareth.  

Students in grades nine through 12 attend Nazareth Area High School in Nazareth. Students in grades seven and eight attend Nazareth Area Middle School, and students in grades five and six attend Nazareth Area Intermediate School. The district maintains three elementary schools for kindergarten through fourth grade, Kenneth N. Butz, Floyd R. Shafer, and Lower Nazareth.

As of the 2021–22 school year, the school district had a total enrollment of 4,821 students between all six of its schools, according to National Center for Education Statistics data. The current superintendent of schools is Richard R. Kaskey.

Schools

Nazareth Area High School - Grades 9-12
Nazareth Area Middle School - Grades 7-8
Nazareth Area Intermediate School - Grades 5-6
Kenneth N. Butz, Jr. Elementary School - Grades K-4
Floyd R. Shafer Elementary School - Grades K-4
Lower Nazareth Elementary School - Grades K-4

Middle school
Due to population growth, the Nazareth Area School District constructed a new middle school for grades seven and eight (approximately 800 students). The project included a new $7 million swimming pool.  The new building is located on Friedenstahl Avenue in Upper Nazareth Township, adjacent to the high school campus.  The school was completed in 2009 in time for the 2009-2010 school year. It cost an estimated total of $57 million.

With the opening of the new middle school in 2009, the Nazareth area underwent a district-wide grade reconfiguration.  Grades Kindergarten through 3rd grade remained in the elementary schools.  Grades 4, 5, and 6 were placed into a new intermediate level with all students in those grades attending the Nazareth Are Intermediate School, utilizing the former middle school building at 355 Tatamy Road.  Grades 7 and 8 now attend the new middle school building.  Only the high school, built in 1956, remains unaffected by the grade changes.

Statistics
According to a 2006 survey distributed to every household in the Nazareth Area School District, with a 19% participation rate:

Residency Within the district
30.9% of respondents lived in Bushkill Township
23.3% lived in Lower Nazareth Township
19.7% lived in Upper Nazareth Township
18.8% lived in the borough of Nazareth
2.5% lived in the borough of Stockertown.
4.4% lived in the borough of Tatamy.

Attendance distribution
40.8% of responding households had NASD students, of those:
18% had children attending Bushkill Elementary School.
17% had children attending Lower Nazareth Elementary School. 
18% had children attending Floyd R. Shafer Elementary School.
37% had children attending Nazareth Area Middle School. 
43% had children attending Nazareth Area High School.

Current board members
Gregory C. Leh (President)
Melissa S. Kalinoski (Vice President)
Kenneth N. Butz, Jr. (Treasurer)
Jodi L. Mammana
Adam McGlynn, Ph.D.
Kathlyn Roberts
Wayne Simpson
Linda G. Stubits, Ed.D.
Joseph T. Vasko

Communication
Attuned to the importance of parent and school communication, the district has established a parental web portal, a web friendly, state-of-the-art communication tool on its website. School events and School Board meetings are posted on the district website calendar.  News about the Nazareth Area School District is reported regularly in The Morning Call and The Express-Times newspapers. As of January, 2011, the Nazareth Area High School also began utilizing the Eagle Call system, allowing students to receive text messages and e-mails directly on mobile devices and cell phones.

Notes

External links
Nazareth Area School District official website
Nazareth Area High School official website
Nazareth Area School District on Facebook

School districts in Northampton County, Pennsylvania